María Pilar García Villalba (born 21 July 1990) is a Spanish footballer who plays as a midfielder for Rayo Vallecano.

Club career
García started her career at Atlético Madrid.

References

External links
Profile at La Liga

1990 births
Living people
Women's association football midfielders
Spanish women's footballers
Footballers from Madrid
Atlético Madrid Femenino players
Rayo Vallecano Femenino players
Keynsham Town L.F.C. players
Primera División (women) players
Spanish expatriate women's footballers
Expatriate women's footballers in England
Spanish expatriate sportspeople in England